Oh Won-Jong (born June 17, 1983) is a South Korean football player who plays for Busan TC.

Club career
He joined K-League side Gyeongnam FC in the 2006 draft. In Gyeongnam, he played 4 league games, and 4 league cup games. One year later, he moved to Korea National League side, Gangneung City FC. He played 21 games, scored 4 goals, and made 1 assist for Gangneung. From 2009, Oh played at newly formed Gangwon FC as founding member. On 29 November 2010, he joined Sangju Sangmu FC for military duty. On 3 September 2012, he discharged from military services and returned Gangwon FC.

Club career statistics

References

External links
 

1983 births
Living people
South Korean footballers
Gyeongnam FC players
Gangwon FC players
Gimcheon Sangmu FC players
K League 1 players
Korea National League players
Association football midfielders